The 1913 VPI Gobblers football team represented Virginia Agricultural and Mechanical College and Polytechnic Institute in the 1913 college football season. The team was led by their head coach Branch Bocock and finished with a record of seven wins, one loss and one tie (7–1–1).

Schedule

Players
The following players were members of the 1913 football team according to the roster published in the 1914 edition of The Bugle, the Virginia Tech yearbook.

Game summaries

Hampden–Sydney
The starting lineup for VPI was: Taylor (left end), Pick (left tackle), Graves (left guard), Clemmer (center), Whitehead (right guard), Caffee (right tackle), Rives (right end), Dixon (quarterback), Parrish (left halfback), Legge (right halfback), Sanders (fullback). The substitutes were: Bright, Effinger, Moore, Peake and Rowe.

Old Miss
The starting lineup for VPI was: Taylor (left end), Pick (left tackle), Graves (left guard), Clemmer (center), Whitehead (right guard), Caffee (right tackle), Rives (right end), Dixon (quarterback), Parrish (left halfback), Legge (right halfback), Sanders (fullback).

North Carolina
The starting lineup for VPI was: Taylor (left end), Pick (left tackle), Whitehead (left guard), Clemmer (center), Graves (right guard), Caffee (right tackle), Rives (right end), Dixon (quarterback), Davis (left halfback), Legge (right halfback), Sanders (fullback).

Washington and Lee
The starting lineup for VPI was: Moore (left end), Pick (left tackle), Whitehead (left guard), Clemmer (center), Graves (right guard), Caffee (right tackle), Taylor (right end), Peake (quarterback), Parrish (left halfback), Legge (right halfback), Sanders (fullback). The substitutes were: Davis, Dixon, Effinger, Harris, MacRuth, Montague and Rives.

Morris Harvey
The starting lineup for VPI was: Moore (left end), Pick (left tackle), Graves (left guard), Clemmer (center), Whitehead (right guard), Caffee (right tackle), Cottrell (right end), Dixon (quarterback), Legge (left halfback), Davis (right halfback), Sanders (fullback).

VMI
The starting lineup for VPI was: Taylor (left end), Pick (left tackle), Graves (left guard), Effinger (center), Whitehead (right guard), Caffee (right tackle), Moore (right end), Dixon (quarterback), Legge (left halfback), Engleby (right halfback), Sanders (fullback). The substitutes were: Clemmer, Cottrell, Davis, McRuth, Parrish, Peake and Rives.

References

VPI
Virginia Tech Hokies football seasons
VPI Gobblers football